Local elections were held in Scotland on 6 April 1995, as part of the Local Government etc. (Scotland) Act 1994. The elections were held for the 29 new mainland unitary authorities created under the act, which replaced the nine former regions established in 1975. The three island areas (Orkney, Shetland and the Western Isles) were retained from the previous system.  These areas did not take part in the 1995 election, having held local elections on 5 May 1994.

National results

|-
!colspan=2|Parties
!Votes
!Votes %
!Councillors
|-
| 
|742,557||43.57||613 
|-
| 
|444,918||26.11||181
|-
| 
|196,109||11.51||82
|-
| 
|166,141||9.79||121
|-
| 
|130,642||7.67||151
|-
| style="width: 10px" style="background-color:" |
| style="text-align: left;" scope="row" | Other
|23,781||1.36||7
|-
!colspan=2|Total!!1,702,148!! !!1,155
|}

Results by council area

Notes and references

See also
Elections in Scotland

External links
Full list of each area can be found here: https://web.archive.org/web/20101105233617/http://www.alba.org.uk/elections/local.html
Full Island Authority Elections which took place on 5 May 1994, can be found here:  https://web.archive.org/web/20080907225750/http://www.alba.org.uk/elections/islands.html
Bourneyed review of 1995 seats: http://www.lgbc-scotland.gov.uk/reports/ea_formation_1995.asp

 
1995
April 1995 events in the United Kingdom